"The Armory" is the second episode of the first season of the TNT science fiction drama Falling Skies, which originally aired June 19, 2011, alongside the pilot episode.
The episode was written by Graham Yost and directed by Greg Beeman.

Weaver sends Tom and a squad to scout out a possible weapons armory, but they are taken hostage by a group of outlaws who then try to use Tom and his team as leverage to acquire food and weapons. The trade is interrupted by an alien ship, which kills most of the outlaws. Their leader, Pope, is taken into custody. Margaret, another one of the outlaws, agrees to fight for the 2nd Mass and help Tom find his enslaved son Ben, who was seen at a nearby hospital only days before.

In the United States, the two-hour series premiere achieved a viewership of 5.91 million, making it the most-watched series premiere of 2011. The episode received a 2.0 rating in the 18–49 demographic, translating to 2.6 million viewers according to the Nielsen ratings.

Plot 
At the Armory, Tom and the other members gather to see if aliens are present. Hal throws a tennis ball to the entrance, hoping that the dog will go for the ball. The dog moves forward, barking and a "mech" appears. Before it can kill the dog, Jimmy stops it, compromising their position. They all move before the Mech attacks.

The next morning, Tom informs Weaver about the previous night's events. He tells Tom to return again tonight. Anne then confronts Weaver about the current sleeping situation, where civilians are living in tents and the fighters in houses. Anne deems it unfair, yet Weaver believes the soldiers need proper rest. Anne and Tom then discuss "civilians vs the military". The pair then watch  Uncle Scott teach the young kids about biology. Later, Uncle Scott talks to Tom about the aliens. He points out that robots humans created were made to look human, with two legs, yet the Skitters' mechs also have two legs, despite a Skitter having six. Tom theorizes the Skitters may have studied Earth before the invasion, and deployed bipedal machines as a form of psychological intimidation. After running in to Lourdes, Karen talks to Hal about her intention. Hal doesn't seem to care about Lourdes and kisses Karen. Tom interrupts, telling Hal they are due to return to the Armory later.

Later that night, the group get ready. Jimmy is told that Click will be going in his place which disappoints him. At the Armory, Click is shot and killed by two arrows and as he goes down, he shoots someone in the leg. It is revealed to be not aliens, but a group of outlaws who capture the group. The outlaws, led by a man named John Pope, take the group to an auditorium, tying them up. Pope interrogates them and Tom responds to all his answers. Pope pulls a gun on Tom, but Hal tells him that they can help him get weapons. Hal is led out of the auditorium by Margaret, a woman in Pope's gang, who gives him one hour to go back and get guns from the 2nd Mass. Tom and Pope discuss the aliens and Tom discovers that Pope is a gifted fighter. Tom asks for a beer and untied by Pope, who notices Tom eying his brother's sidearm. He confronts him about it and Tom asks "What would you do?"

Hal returns and informs Weaver about the situation. Weaver says they will not trade with Pope and orders Mike to take Hal upstairs as prisoner until they are ready to leave. Mike, however, allows Hal to leave and on the way, Hal runs into Anne, who offers her assistance. They both return to find Margaret who escorts them back to Pope. Anne offers her assistance in relation to Pope's wounded brother, Billy. She bandages up his leg and Pope leaves him, Cueball and Margaret in charge of the prisoners as he and his other outlaws attempt to rob the 2nd Mass.

Pope sends a flare into the air to alert the airships, giving Weaver an ultimatum. Weaver reluctantly agrees and hands over food and ammunition. Back at Pope's base, Billy, Cueball and Margaret hold Tom and the others captive. Billy tells Karen to stand up and show her body, aggravating Margaret, who kills Billy and Cueball. She then lets the hostages go.

As Pope and his group load up the car, Tom and the other militia fire at them with guns, killing some of Pope's men. Tom offers him an ultimatum: "Join or die." Pope declines and waits for the aliens’ attack. An airship flies above Pope, who drives away, allowing his men to be killed by the ships. Pope pulls aside not far away, trying to escape, but Weaver pulls a gun on him, taking him prisoner.

The next day, Weaver talks to Tom about the events that occurred the previous night. He then hands Pope over to Tom, who puts him in custody. Tom meets up with Matt for a quick game of catch. After, Tom, Hal, Karen, Dai, Anthony and Margaret go in search for Ben at a local hospital.

Production

Development 
The episode was written by Graham Yost and directed by Greg Beeman. This marks Beeman's first directional episode of the series. He later goes on to direct the third episode in the series, Prisoner of War and the season finale, Eight Hours.
The episode was filmed in July 2010, a year before the episode's original airing.
Greg Beeman stated that his first big project in the episode was to occupy an entire neighborhood. He needed to find an area that showed "No sign of humanity besides our fighters. That means we could see no cars driving by, no planes flying by, no incidental pedestrians, etc, etc… Sometimes we had to take these kinds of things out digitally – but, mostly, we had to figure out ways to frame them out."

The Armory marks the first appearance of Colin Cunningham's character John Pope and Sarah Carter's character, Margaret. Pope is the leader of a post-apocalyptic gang and Margaret is a woman who used to be part of the gang. She helped Tom and his team escape after Pope holds them hostage.

Reception

Ratings 
In its original American broadcast, the two-hour premiere of Falling Skies was seen by an estimated 5.9 million household viewers, according to Nielsen Media Research, making it cable television's #1 series launch of the year. It also delivered more than 2.6 million adults 18–49 and 3.2 million adults 25–54.

Reviews 
At review aggregator Metacritic the first season scored 71%, based on 26 critic reviews, indicating "generally favorable reviews."

Tim Goodman of The Hollywood Reporter wrote "...the entertainment value and suspense of Falling Skies is paced just right. You get the sense that we'll get those answers eventually. And yet, you want to devour the next episode immediately." Thomas Conner of the Chicago Sun-Times called it "...a trustworthy family drama but with aliens." He continued, "It's 'Jericho' meets 'V', with the good from both and the bad discarded. It'll raise the summer-TV bar significantly." Ken Tucker from Entertainment Weekly gave the series a B+ and wrote, "A similar, gradually developed, but decisive conviction makes Falling Skies an engaging, if derivative, chunk of dystopian sci-fi." He continued, "...Falling Skies rises above any one performance; it's the spectacle of humans versus aliens that draws you in."

References 

2011 American television episodes
Falling Skies (season 1) episodes